The Art of the Song is an album by jazz bassist Charlie Haden and his Quartet West, released in 1999. It reached number ten on the Billboard Top Jazz Albums chart.

Quartet West was formed in 1986. Their repertoire consisted mainly of music from the 1930s and 1940s, often music associated with films of that period.

Guest vocalists Bill Henderson and Shirley Horn each perform four songs.

The orchestral accompaniment written for Shirley Horn of Leonard Bernstein's "Lonely Town", won Alan Broadbent a Grammy Award.

Reception 

John Sharpe in All About Jazz wrote, "The Art Of The Song is an evocative collection of sombre ballads, immaculately performed..." while Richard S. Ginell of Allmusic writes "Frankly, this sounds like the work of a weary musician."

Track listing 
 "Lonely Town" (Leonard Bernstein, Betty Comden, Adolph Green) – 5:30
 "Why Did I Choose You" (Michael Leonard, Herbert Martin) – 7:23
 "Moment Musical, Op. 16, No. 3 in B minor" (Sergei Rachmaninoff) – 5:36
 "In Love in Vain" (Jerome Kern, Leo Rubin) – 5:05
 "Ruth's Waltz" (Charlie Haden, Arthur Hamilton) – 4:14
 "Scenes from a Silver Screen" (Alan Broadbent) – 6:24
 "I'm Gonna Laugh You Right out of My Life" (Cy Coleman, Joseph A. McCarthy) – 6:15
 "You My Love" (Jimmy Van Heusen, Mack Gordon) – 4:24
 "Prelude en La Mineur" (Maurice Ravel) – 5:14
 "The Folks Who Live On the Hill" (Jerome Kern, Oscar Hammerstein II) – 6:56
 "Easy on the Heart" (Haden, Hamilton) – 4:54
 "Theme for Charlie" (Jeri Southern) – 4:07
 "Wayfaring Stranger" (Traditional) – 4:23

Personnel 
Charlie Haden Quartet West
 Charlie Haden – bass, lead vocal on "Wayfaring Stranger"
Alan Broadbent – piano, arranger, conductor, orchestration
Larance Marable – drums
Ernie Watts – tenor saxophone

Guest musicians
Murray Adler – violin, conductor, concertmaster, orchestra contractor
Bill Henderson – vocals on "Why Did I Choose You", "Ruth's Waltz", "You My Love", "Easy on the Heart"
Shirley Horn – vocals on "Lonely Town", "In Love in Vain", "I'm Gonna Laugh You Right Out of My Life", "The Folks Who Live on the Hill"

Orchestra
Ezra Kliger – violin
Gina Kronstadt – violin
Don Palmer – violin
Robert Peterson – violin
Kathleen Robinson – violin
Robert Sanov – violin
Harry Shirinian – violin
Paul Shure – violin
Rachel Sokolow – violin
Marcy Vaj – violin
Francine Walsh – violin
Tibor Zelig – violin
Charlie Bisharat – violin
Robert Brosseau – violin
Bobby Bruce – violin
Israel Baker – violin
Russ Cantor – violin
Suzanna Giordono – viola
Steve Gordon – viola
Paolo Gozzetti – viola
Mimi Granat – viola
Carol Mukagawa – viola
Earl Madison – cello
Ray Kelley – cello
Suzie Katayama – cello
Jerry Kessler – cello
Larry Corbett – cello
Adrian Rosen – bass

Production
 Charlie Haden – producer
 Ruth Cameron – producer
 Daniel Richard – executive Producer
 Jean-Philippe Allard – executive Producer
Orrin Keepnews – liner notes
Jay Newland – engineer, mastering, mixing, mixing engineer
Dann Michael Thompson – engineer, mixing
Glen Kolotkin – mastering
Maureen Murphy – release coordinator
John Newcott – release coordinator
Carol Friedman – photography, cover photo
Patrice Beausejour – art direction
Greg Allen – photography

References 

1999 albums
Charlie Haden albums
Albums recorded at Capitol Studios